French Assyrians, alternatively are French citizens of Assyrian ancestry. There are around 16,000  most of whom are concentrated in the Paris metropolitan area.

History 
The community has a history in France dating back to the First World War, with most arriving during the 1920s in Marseille as a result of the Assyrian genocide. 

The bulk of the Assyrian presence dates back to the early 20th century, when some Assyrians, fleeing the Assyrian genocide, found refuge in France. Others arrived from rural south-eastern Turkey as a result of the Kurdish–Turkish conflict in the 1960s and 70s. Their numbers swelled after the Iraq War in 2003 by those arriving from Iraqi cities.

Population 
There are 30,000 Assyrians living in France. The first Assyrians arrived in Marseille France in the 1920's as refugees from the genocide of the Assyrians by Turks during World War One, in which 750,000 Assyrians (75%) were killed, as well as 1 million Greeks and 1.5 million Armenians. Around 10,000 of Assyrians live in Sarcelles, a suburb of Paris. They are generally compared to French Jews who  are seen as inward-looking, conservative and well-integrated in the French society. 10,000 (of 16,000) Chaldeans live in Sarcelles.

Notable French Assyrians

 Maria Theresa Asmar
 François David
 Henri Jibrayel
 Agha Petros
 Pascal Esho Warda

See also
 The Last Assyrians
 Assyrians in Belgium

External links 
 Association des Assyro-Chaldéens de France
 Assyrians Establish National Federation in France

Notes

References 
 

Assyrians
France
Assyrian ethnic groups
 
Middle Eastern diaspora in France